Tharon Drake is an American swimmer.  He is the current U.S. record-holder in S11 class in 50m freestyle, 50m and 100m backstroke, 50m and 100m breaststroke, 200m individual medley (short course); 50m and 100m breaststroke (short course); 50m, 100m and 200m breaststroke (long course).  Drake won silver in the 100m breast at the 2015 IPC Swimming World Championship. Drake lost his eyesight following complications from a routine vaccination.

At the 2016 Paralympic Games, Drake won a silver medal in the 400m Freestyle S11. Drake's time in the finals was 4:40.96, behind USA teammate Brad Snyder.  Drake also won a silver medal in the 100m breaststroke SB11 with a time of 1:11.50.

Drake competed in the 2017 World Para Swimming Championships held in Mexico City, Mexico. Drake won a gold medal in the 400m Freestyle S11 with a finish time of 4:54.30, a gold medal in the 100m Breaststroke SB11 with a finish time of 1:15.70, and a silver medal in the 200m Individual Medley SM11 with a finish time of 2:41.70.

Drake is now assistant coach of the Catawba College Men's and Women's Swim Team.

Swimming career
Tharon began swimming at the age of 9. He swam on the Hobbs High School and Caprock Swim Team, both in Hobbs, New Mexico. In November 2007, Drake experienced amnesia that was onset from routine vaccines. It was determined that an existing genetic condition compromised his immune system and his body couldn't fight off the viruses from the vaccines.  Through help of medication, he was able to overcome the amnesia. In February 2008, Drake noticed some changes in his vision, and by June 2008, he was totally blind, without any perception of light.

After graduating high school in 2011, Tharon continued his path in swimming and qualified as an alternate for the 2012 London Paralympics.

See also
 Swimming at the 2016 Summer Paralympics

References

1992 births
Living people
American male breaststroke swimmers
Paralympic swimmers of the United States
People from Canyon, Texas
Swimmers at the 2016 Summer Paralympics
Medalists at the 2016 Summer Paralympics
Medalists at the World Para Swimming Championships
Paralympic medalists in swimming
Paralympic silver medalists for the United States
Medalists at the 2011 Parapan American Games
People from Hobbs, New Mexico
Sportspeople with a vision impairment
American blind people
American male medley swimmers
American male freestyle swimmers
S11-classified Paralympic swimmers
21st-century American people